Antimima aurasensis is a species of plant in the family Aizoaceae. It is endemic to Namibia.  Its natural habitats are subtropical or tropical dry shrubland and rocky areas.

References

Flora of Namibia
aurasensis
Least concern plants
Taxonomy articles created by Polbot